Jacques Rivette (1 March 1928 – 29 January 2016) was a French film director, screenwriter and film critic. He wrote and directed twenty feature films, including the two-part Joan the Maiden, eight short films and a three-part television documentary. He also acted in small roles and participated in documentaries. After making his first short film, Aux quatre coins, in his hometown of Rouen, Rivette moved to Paris in 1949 to pursue a career in filmmaking. While attending film screenings at Henri Langlois' Cinémathèque Française and other ciné-clubs he gradually befriended many future members of the French New Wave, including François Truffaut, Jean-Luc Godard, Éric Rohmer and Claude Chabrol. Rivette's association with this group of young cinephiles led to the start of both his filmmaking career and his work in film criticism. In collaboration with his new friends, Rivette made two more short films and worked as a cinematographer and editor on films by Rohmer and Truffaut. He also worked in small roles and as an assistant director to Jean Renoir on French Cancan and Jacques Becker on Ali Baba and the Forty Thieves. During this period he began writing film criticism for the magazine Gazette du Cinéma and later Cahiers du Cinéma, and was one of the most respected writers by his peers.

In 1956 Rivette made the short film Le Coup du Berger, which Truffaut credited as enacting the New Wave movement. The following year he began work on his first feature film with the initial support of Italian neorealist director Roberto Rossellini. Paris Belongs to Us was shot in the summer of 1958, but not released theatrically until 1961, after Chabrol, Truffaut and Godard had their feature-film debuts distributed and made the New Wave renowned worldwide. After staging a theatrical version of Denis Diderot's novel La Religieuse starring Anna Karina in 1963, Rivette became the editor-in-chief of Cahiers du Cinéma until 1965. He then began production on a film version of La Religieuse, which led to a lengthy public battle with French censorship over the film's release. Finally released in 1967, the publicity made it financially successful.

Rivette was unhappy with La Religieuse and re-evaluated his career, developing a unique cinematic style with L'Amour fou. Influenced by the political turmoil of May 1968, improvisational theater and an in-depth interview with Jean Renoir, Rivette began working with large groups of actors on character development and allowing events to unfold on camera. This technique led to the thirteen-hour Out 1. His films of the 1970s, such as Celine and Julie Go Boating, often incorporated fantasy and were better-regarded. After attempting to make four consecutive films, however, Rivette had a nervous breakdown and his career slowed for several years, with films such as Merry-Go-Round and Le Pont du Nord being difficult productions.

During the early 1980s, he began a business partnership with producer Martine Marignac, who produced all his subsequent films. Rivette's output increased from then on, with films such as Gang of Four and La Belle Noiseuse receiving international praise. He continued making films until 2009, retiring after the early symptoms of Alzheimer's disease made the production of 36 vues du pic Saint-Loup too difficult for him to continue. Many of his films are known for their long running time, including the 760-minute Out 1. Almost always at the insistence of the distributors, Rivette edited shorter versions of five of his films and considered some of them to be entirely new films with different meanings.

Films

Feature films

Short films and television work

Other work

Theater work

Alternative versions of his films

Rivette edited shorter versions of several of his films with long running times. When L'Amour fou was released in January 1969 the 127 minute alternate version was simultaneously released at the production company's request. This version was simply a shorter version of the original work and Rivette immediately disowned it.

The shorter Out 1: Spectre was 260 minutes and released in March 1974. Rivette said that Spectre was more of "a fiction about certain characters", "much tighter", "more compelling" and that it was "a different film having its own logic; closer to a jigsaw or crossword puzzle than was [Noli me tangere], playing less on affectivity, more on rhymes and contrasts, ruptures and connections, caesurae and censorship." When Out 1: Noli me tangere was restored in 2006, Rivette re-edited the film, rearranging scenes and cutting a ten-minute sequence out of the original 760 minute version.

Love on the Ground was released as a 120-minute version after Rivette was forced to cut 50 minutes by the film's distributor. He said that the longer version was more complex and "structured similarly to Raymond Roussel's New Impressions of Africa, where there is a phrase, and then a parenthesis, which is tied to yet another phrase, and another parenthesis, ad infinitum." In order to cut 50 minutes out he simply "lifted the parentheses."

The shorter cut of La Belle noiseuse (called La Belle noiseuse: Divertimento) was 120 minutes. He made this version due to contractual obligations to the film's producers and used different takes than the original film. This version is an entirely new film and not just a shorter version of the original work. The word Divertimento is both a reference to Igor Stravinsky's Divertimento from Le baiser de la fée and translates to a "not too serious work." This shorter version changes the film's focus from the process of creating art to the evaluation of the finished product.

Rivette's original 220 minute cut of Va Savoir (called Va Savoir+) premiered on 24 April 2002 and only sold 1,734 tickets in its seven-week theatrical run at the cinema du Pantheon in Paris. Rivette said that Va Savoir+ is a completely different film than Va Savoir, the major difference being lengthy scenes of the actors performing Pirandello's Come tu mi vuoi instead of just rehearsals. Rivette said that in the longer version Pirandello's play is "another character" in the film.

See also
Themes and style in the works of Jacques Rivette

References

Notes

Bibliography

 
 
 
 
 
 
 
 
 
 

Filmography
Director filmographies
French filmographies